Lucius Aemilius Mamercus was a Roman statesman who served as consul three times: in 484, 478 and 473 BC.

In 484 BC, as consul, Aemilius led the Roman forces in battle against the Volsci and Aequi.  The Romans were successful, and the Roman cavalry slaughtered many in the rout which followed.

Livy says that during his first consulship, Aemilius (together with his colleague Caeso Fabius Vibulanus) worked with the senate to oppose increases to the powers of the tribunes.

In 478 BC, Aemilius led a Roman army successfully against the Etruscans.

See also
 Aemilia gens

References

Year of birth uncertain
Year of death uncertain
5th-century BC Roman consuls
Mamercus, Lucius